The Cessna 120, 140, and 140A, are single-engine, two-seat, conventional landing gear (tailwheel), light general aviation aircraft that were first produced in 1946, immediately following the end of World War II.  Production ended in 1951, and was succeeded in 1959 by the Cessna 150, a similar two-seat trainer which introduced tricycle gear.  Combined production of the 120, 140, and 140A was 7,664 units in five years.

Development

Cessna 140

This model had a metal fuselage and fabric wings with metal control surfaces. The larger Cessna 170 was a four-seat 140 with a more powerful engine.

Cessna 120

The Cessna 120 was an economy version of the 140 produced at the same time. It had the same engine as the 140, but lacked wing flaps. The rear-cabin "D" side windows and electrical system (radios, lights, battery and starter) were optional. A 120 outfitted with every factory option would be nearly equivalent to a 140, but the International Cessna 120/140 Association believes that no 120s were originally built this way. Despite this, many decades' worth of owner-added options have rendered many 120s almost indistinguishable from a 140 aside from the absence of wing flaps. The 120 was dropped from production upon introduction of the 140A in 1949.

Cessna 140A

In 1949, Cessna introduced the 140A, a new variant with aluminum-covered wings and single wing struts instead of the fabric wing covering, dual "V" struts, and jury struts fitted on earlier models. The spring-steel gear had been swept  forward on 120 and 140 models in late 1947 so wheel extenders were no longer necessary to counter nose-over tendencies during heavy application of brakes; all 140A models had the improved gear legs. Despite these improvements, sales of the 140 lineup faltered, and the 140A comprised only seven percent of overall 120/140 production.

Modifications
Common modifications to the Cessna 120 and 140 include:

"Metalized" wings, where the fabric is replaced with light-gauge sheet aluminum, eliminating the need to periodically replace the wing fabric.
The installation of landing gear extenders to reduce the tendency of the aircraft to nose over on application of heavy braking. These were factory-optional equipment.
Installation of rear-cabin "D" side windows on 120s that were not originally so equipped.
Installation of electrical systems on 120s that were not originally so equipped, allowing owners to install an electric starter, more sophisticated avionics and/or lights for night flying.
Installation of a more powerful engine. A popular conversion today is to replace the original C-85 or C-90 with a 100 hp (75 kW) Continental O-200. A kit is available to install a Lycoming O-320 but this conversion is less prevalent due to a roughly 100 lb (45 kg) weight penalty and a sharp increase in fuel consumption.

Operators

Military

Guatemalan Air Force

Nicaraguan Air Force

Specifications (Cessna 140)

See also

References

External links

 AVweb's Cessna 120/140 Review, an extensive article on the history and features of the type

140
High-wing aircraft
Single-engined tractor aircraft
1940s United States civil utility aircraft
Aircraft first flown in 1945